Down Home Sessions II is the second extended play album from American country music artist Cole Swindell.  The album includes five tracks, all co-written by Swindell.

Critical reception 
Mark Deming of AllMusic rated the album 3.5 out of 5 stars, saying that Swindell "sings five more songs of good times, good music, beautiful women, cold beer, and broken hearts, accompanied by uptempo arrangements and polished production that bridge the gap between the worlds of country and pop." Nash Country Weekly reviewer Jon Freeman was less favorable, saying that "His music, tuneful as it is, often feels precisely calibrated for a certain lifestyle segment as if it’s a soft drink or a friendly fast food chain", ultimately giving the album a "C". In 2017, Billboard contributor Chuck Dauphin put "Should've Ran After You" at number eight on his top 10 list of Swindell's best songs.

Track listing

Personnel
Pat Buchanan – electric guitar
Michael Carter – acoustic guitar, electric guitar, keyboards, programming, background vocals
Dave Cohen – keyboards
James Mitchell – electric guitar
Greg Morrow – drums, percussion
Billy Panda – acoustic guitar
Cole Swindell – lead vocals
Russell Terrell – background vocals
Mike Wolofsky – bass guitar

Charts

References

2015 EPs
Cole Swindell EPs
Warner Records EPs